Frogmore is a plantation house on Edisto Island, South Carolina, built by Waccamaw's Dr. Edward Mitchell in approximately 1820 following his marriage to Edisto Island's Elizabeth Baynard.

Frogmore, a rectangular, two-story, hip-roofed house, has a distinctive cotton plantation on an antebellum sea island. Mitchell ran a large plantation with more than 100 slaves in 1840.

When Edisto Island was occupied by the Federal union from 1862 onward, Colonel Moore of the 55th Pennsylvania Infantry used Frogmore as his headquarters.

On May 5, 1987, Frogmore was added to the United States National Register of Historic Places.

References

National Register of Historic Places in Charleston County, South Carolina
Houses in Charleston County, South Carolina
Houses on the National Register of Historic Places in South Carolina
Houses completed in 1820
Plantation houses in South Carolina
Greek Revival houses in South Carolina
1820 establishments in South Carolina
Cotton plantations in the United States